The Holy Family Cathedral or Cathedral of Rumbek, is a religious building belonging to the Roman Catholic Church is located in the town of Rumbek, capital of Lakes State, in the African country of South Sudan, and that serves as the seat of the bishop of Rumbek.

A relatively modest cathedral, it is a small building dedicated to the Holy Family, more like a chapel of a mission than a traditional cathedral in the architectural sense. It was restored by Bishop Cesare Mazzolari (1937-2011).

It was built in 1955 when the territory was still part of Anglo-Egyptian Sudan.

See also
Roman Catholicism in South Sudan
Holy Family Church (disambiguation)

References

Roman Catholic cathedrals in South Sudan
Rumbek
Roman Catholic churches completed in 1955
1955 establishments in Sudan
20th-century Roman Catholic church buildings